ANTlabs (ANTlabs Pte. Ltd.) is a network technology company based in Singapore. ANTlabs specialises in providing network access management devices centered around Hospitality, Large Venue Networks, Telco and ISP. ANTlabs products are typically used in visitor-based networks such as those in hotels, telecommunications companies, Internet service providers, airports, campuses convention centers and stadiums. 

ANTlabs products such as IG series, SG series, ACS (ANTlabs Cloud Services), ASP (ANTlabs Service Platform), SSG (Service Selection Gateways), Tru’Auth and InnGate are well known for guest Internet access control, bandwidth management, and guest Internet monetisation by enabling location-based network access control and centralised network policy management. In 2020, ANTlabs started providing managed WiFi solutions for service providers. 

ANTlabs has offices in Singapore, Dubai, Philippines, and South Korea.

Overview
ANTlabs products are for both large and small-scale settings, catering to the needs of Telcos/ISP infrastructures, hospitality industry and enterprise/visitor-based networks.

History
ANTlabs was founded and established on 15 October 1999 by Ang Kwang Tat, Aw Peng Soon, John Sim, Rhandeev Singh, Teo Wee Tuck and Toh Young Koon in Singapore. ANTlabs initially provided guest Internet management before branching into the telco hot spot space in 2001. In 2004, ANTlabs deployed to Europe, China, Middle East, Australia, and Asia, and in January 2007, ANTlabs secured their first million-dollar network services and maintenance contract for Changi Airport. They opened a branch in Johor Bahru, Malaysia in 2013, the Dubai office in 2017, and the South Korea office in 2018.

Hong Kong and Macau business
GUNA Technologies is the channel-only sole distributor in Hong Kong and Macau of ANTlabs. GUNA and ANTlabs provide End-To-End support serice, include technical consulting and pre-sales and post-sales.

Middle East business
With partners in GCC countries, Antlabs have deployed their technology into HIA airport and other businesses.

References

External links
Official Website
IT Companies Review
Hong Kong and Macau Sole Distributor

Information technology companies of Singapore
Networking hardware companies
Computer companies established in 1999
Technology companies established in 1999
1999 establishments in Singapore
Singaporean brands